3963 Paradzhanov, provisional designation , is a Nysian asteroid from the inner regions of the asteroid belt, approximately 6 kilometers in diameter. It was discovered on 8 October 1969, by astronomer Lyudmila Chernykh at the Crimean Astrophysical Observatory in Nauchnyj, on the Crimean peninsula. The asteroid was named after Soviet film director Sergei Parajanov (Sargis Paradzhanov) in 1996.

Orbit and classification 

Paradzhanov is a member of the Nysa family, the asteroid belt's largest asteroid family. The low-inclination family is located in the inner main-belt and named after 44 Nysa. It is better described as the "Nysa-Polana complex" because it consists of two albedo-groups and at least three collisional families: Nysa, Polana, Eulalia, named after 142 Polana and 495 Eulalia. These are difficult to distinguish as they are dynamically overlapping with different but varying albedos. Paradzhanov has a relatively high albedo (see below) which places it into the stony Nysian subgroup of the "Nysa-Polana complex".

It orbits the Sun at a distance of 2.0–2.9 AU once every 3 years and 10 months (1,392 days). Its orbit has an eccentricity of 0.20 and an inclination of 3° with respect to the ecliptic.

Physical characteristics

Rotation period 

As of 2017, no rotational lightcurve of Paradzhanov has been obtained from photometric observations. The asteroid's rotation period, poles and shape remain unknown.

Diameter and albedo 

According to the survey carried out by the NEOWISE mission of NASA's Wide-field Infrared Survey Explorer, Paradzhanov measures 5.779 kilometers in diameter and its surface has an albedo of 0.192.

Naming 

This minor planet was named in memory of Georgian–Soviet film director Sergei Parajanov (1924–1990) (Sargis Paradzhanov). In 1965, he became internationally acknowledged with his feature film Shadows of Forgotten Ancestors, but also a target of the Soviet regime. The official naming citation was published by the Minor Planet Center on 3 May 1996.

References

External links 
 Sergei Parajanov, website
 Asteroid Lightcurve Database (LCDB), query form (info )
 Dictionary of Minor Planet Names, Google books
 Asteroids and comets rotation curves, CdR – Observatoire de Genève, Raoul Behrend
 Discovery Circumstances: Numbered Minor Planets (1)-(5000) – Minor Planet Center
 
 

003963
Discoveries by Lyudmila Chernykh
Named minor planets
19691008